Rochelle Ballard (born February 13, 1971) is an American professional surfer and a veteran of the Association of Surfing Professionals (ASP) World Championship Tour. She co-founded International Women's Surfing (IWS) and has appeared in several movies and television shows, most notably, Blue Crush, Step Into Liquid, and Beyond the Break.

Early life
Ballard was born Rochelle Gordines in Montebello, California on February 13, 1971. Her parents moved to the island of Kauai in Hawaii when she was six months old. With the encouragement of Margo Oberg, Ballard started surfing at 12 years old. Oberg had been a top surfing professional for more than three decades and was a mentor to Ballard when she was first learning to surf at Kauai's north shore.

Career 
Ballard began surfing local competitions and then advancing to state competitions, and then on to nationals, and then on to the world amateur titles where she placed fourth in the World in 1988 and 1990. She qualified to surf professionally on the World Championship Tour in 1991.

“I really admired her big wave surfing,” said Ballard in Christina Lessa's book Women Who Win. “She received so much respect for what she did. She took me out surfing quite a bit one year, spent time with me, gave me pointers, and encouraged me to brave larger waves. I developed a love for surfing, a love that is almost impossible to express. There’s an energy in the water that gives you every kind of feeling: peace, excitement, fear, a huge adrenaline rush, discouragement, and frustration. The nature of surfing is such that you can’t control the waves. You have to flow with them and find the rhythm of the ocean in order to work with it and experience what the ocean has to offer. Surfing is an art—we draw a new line on each wave we ride. It’s also a science. You need to study the patterns of the ocean. And it’s an ongoing lesson, because every few years, the tides completely change.”

When she wasn't competing she was appearing in and helping her husband to produce a long string of women's-only surf movies including the original Blue Crush.

Ballard worked with her husband to produce the movie Blue Crush in 2002, as well as serving as a stunt double in it. She also starred in A Girl's Surf Addiction, a surf film that O'Neill released in 2004. She also helped produce a "yoga for surfers" video series.  In 2001, she starred in the surfing documentary 7 Girls.
She co-founded International Women's Surfing (IWS) and, together with O'Neill, launched the Rochelle Ballard Surf Camp series which focuses on advanced surfing techniques, cross-training, and education.

In 2012, she became the ISA World Masters World Champion. During her years on tour, Ballard won seven world championship events and was runner-up to the World Championship title in 2004. In 1997, at the Billabong Pro at Burleigh Heads, Gold Coast, Australia, Ballard scored two perfect 10-barrel rides against Layne Beachley in the semi-finals and went on to win the event after beating Lisa Anderson in the finals. Ballard continues to hold the women's world record for scoring two perfect 10s in a single heat.

Ballard has been featured on local and national news and in magazines such as
Surfing, TW Surf, Surfer, SG Magazine, Surfing Girl, Women Outside, Women's Sports and Fitness, Fit Magazine, Sports Illustrated Women, People, National Geographic.

Personal life
In 1991 Rochelle married cinematographer, Bill Ballard.

She currently resides on the island of Kauai, where she operates a surf, yoga, and wellness business called Surf Into Yoga.

Contest highlights
2012
Women's Division ISA World Masters Surfing Champion

2004
3rd Rip Curl Pro, Malibu
2nd Billabong Pro, Teahupoo, Tahiti
2nd Roxy Pro, Fiji
2nd Roxy Pro, Australia

2003
2nd Billabong Pro, Teahupoo, Tahiti
3rd Magnolia Girls Pro. Portugal

2002
3rd Roxy Pro, Tavarua, Fiji
3rd Roxy Pro, France

2001
2nd Billabong Pro, Teahupoo, Tahiti

2000
1st OP Boat Challenge

1999
1st Gotcha Girl Star Pro, U.S.
1st Hossegor Rip Curl Pro, France

1997
1st Billabong Pro, AUS
1st Kana Beach Lacanau Pro, France
1st Wahine Women's (WQS)
1st Gunston 500 Women WQS), South Africa
1st Wahine Women's (WQS), U.S.

1996
1st Wahine Women's, U.S.
1st Town &Country, Hawaii

1995
1st Body Glove Surfbout VIII, U.S.

External links
 Rochelle Ballard Official Site
 "Where I'm From", HONOLULU Magazine ~ November 2006

References

1971 births
Living people
Sportspeople from Montebello, California
American surfers
World Surf League surfers
People from Kauai County, Hawaii
American female surfers
Sportspeople from Hawaii
21st-century American women